Nukissiorfiit is a government-owned Greenland energy company. Nukissiorfiit means "where energies are created". The company supplies most of Greenland with electricity, water and heat. Most of the electricity is produced by hydro power such as the Qorlortorsuaq Dam. 70% of Greenland's energy is produced by renewable sources. The rest is produced by oil burned plants. The company employs 400 people, spread on 17 cities and 54 villages.

There is a lot of potential yet unbuilt hydro power. However the rugged terrain, the fjords and the usually short distance between the ice sheet and fjords means there are many short small rivers, meaning benefit per power plant is smaller. A port and a road must be built for each one. In the winter rivers are frozen, so dams are needed to create water flow during winter. 
Sometimes power lines must cross fjords with spans like the Ameralik Span, the world's longest span. This means that costs are high and therefore there was a lot of hesitation on replacing oil fired power plants with hydropower. Rising oil prices supported decision to build more hydro power plants.

List of hydroelectric power plants

References

References

Companies based in Nuuk
Energy companies of Greenland